This is a list of Sanskrit mottoes of non-educational institutions, including but not limited to, in the nations in Indosphere which were historically Indianized as part of Greater India. This list specifically excludes educational institutions which have Sanskrit phrases as their mottoes. See also Symbolic usage of Sanskrit.

Cambodia

:  (Chéat Sasna Preăhmôhaksât) (Sanskritised Khmer: Nation Religion King)

India

Indonesia

In Indonesia, Sanskrit is mostly and widely used in mottoes and terms in the Armed Forces, educational and government institutions respectively. 
 Aceh Province: Panchachita - "Five Goals"
 Audit Board of Indonesia: Tri Dharma Arthasantosha - "Strive to achieve the 3 (three) successful auditing principles (finance, supervision, and management) towards the realization of the perfection of State Finance responsibilities".
 Bali Province: Bali Dvipa Jaya - "Glorious Bali Island"
 Central Java Province: Prasetya Ulah Sakti Bhakti Praja - "Promise to try hard and loyal to the nation"
 Jakarta:  Jaya Raya - "Glorious and Great"
 Gunung Kidul Regency: 
 Banyuwangi Regency: , 
 Indonesian National Police: Rashtra Sevakottama (राष्ट्र सेवकोटामा) - "People's Main Servants"
 Indonesian National Armed Forces: Tri Dharma Eka Karma (त्रि धर्म एक कर्मा)
 Indonesian Army: Kartika Eka Pakshi - "Unmatchable Bird with Noble Goals"
Army Special Forces Command (Kopassus): official motto: Tribhuana Chandracha Satya Dharma
 Indonesian Navy: Jalesveva Jayamahai (जलस्वेव जयमहए) - "On the Sea We Are Glorious" 
 Indonesian Marine Corps: Jalesu Bumyamcha Jayamahai (जलेसु भुम्यांचा जयमहै) - "On the Sea and Land we are glorious"
 Indonesian Air Force: Swabhuana Paksa (स्वभुआणा पक्ष) - "The Wings of the Motherland"
 Indonesian Air Force Infantry and Special Forces: Karmanye Vadhikaraste Ma falesu Kadachana - "You have the right to perform your prescribed duty, but you are not entitled to the fruits of action" (Given by Indonesia's first president Sukarno quoting from the Bhagavad Gita, Chapter 2, Verse 47)
 Indonesian Military Academy ("Akmil"): Adhitakarya Mahatvavirya Nagarabhakti (अधिकाऱ्या महत्व विर्य नगरभक्ति) - (Hard-working Knights Serving Bravery as Nations Hero")
 Indonesian Police Academy ("Akpol"): Dharma, Bijaksana, Kshatriya (धर्म बिजक्साना क्षत्रिय) 
Indonesian Fire Brigade: Yudha Brama Jaya 
National Search and Rescue Agency: Avignam Jagat Samagram - "May the universe be saved"
Indonesian Army Staff and Command College ("Seskoad"): Viyata Vira Jati
Indonesian Army Officer Candidate School ("Secapa-ad"): Budi Bhakti Wira Utama 
 Indonesian Naval Academy ("A.A.L."): Hree Dharma Shanty - "Embarrassed for Doing The Defects" 
Indonesian Naval Staff and Command College ("Sesko-al"): Dharma Wiratama
 Indonesian Air Force Academy ("A.A.U."): Vidya Karma Vira Pakcha
Indonesian Air Force Doctrine Development, Education and Training Command ("Kodiklat-au"): Vidyasana Viveka Vardhana
Indonesian Police Knowledge College ("P.T.I.K."): Bhakti-Dharma-Waspada
Institute of Domestic Governance ("I.P.D.N."): Among Praja Dharma Satya Nagari Bhakti
Sebelas Maret University: Mangesti Luhur Ambangun Nagara (mixture with Old Javanese influence)
Ganesha University of Education: Dharmaning Sajjana Umerdhyaken Vidyaguna (mixture with Old Javanese influence)
Mahasaraswati University of Denpasar: Gonging Maha Pataka Muddha Hetu (mixture with Balinese language influence)

Laos

: ສັນຕິພາບ ເອກະລາດ ປະຊາທິປະໄຕ ເອກະພາບ ວັດທະນາຖາວອນ (Sanskrit based Lao  via Khmer language: Peace, independence, democracy, unity and prosperity)

Myanmar

: Formerly သမဂ္ဂါနံ တပေါ သုခေါ (samaggānaṃ tapo sukho) (Sanskrit based Burmese: Happiness through harmony). Currently none.

Nepal

 Nepal: '' Janani Janmabhūmisca Svargādapi garīyasi "Mother and motherland are greater than heaven"
Nepal Rastra Bank:'' Asatoma Sadgamaya "Illusion to reality"
Nepali Army: Eastern Division: 'राष्ट्र रक्षा परम कर्तव्य' "National defense is the ultimate duty", Mid Division: 'अटल भक्ति देश प्रति' "Unwavering devotion to the country", Valley Division: 'शान्ति सुरक्षा सर्वदा' "Peace and security always", Western Division: 'रक्षा नै धर्म हो' "Defense is virtue", North West Division: 'सदैव समर्पित देश प्रति' "Forever dedicated to the country", Far Western Division: 'भक्ति नै शक्ति हो' "Devotion is power".
Nepalese Military Academy: 'ज्ञान, सेवा, नेतृत्व' "Knowledge, Service, Leadership"
Nepal Police: 'सत्य सेवा सुरक्षणम्' "Truth, Service & Security"
Nepal APF: 'शान्ति सुरक्षा प्रतिबद्धता' "Peace, Security Commitment"
Nepal Sanskrit University: 'सरस्वती नः सुभगा मयस्करत' "May Saraswati make us all overall prosperous"

Sri Lanka

Thailand

: none, unofficially ชาติ ศาสนา พระมหากษัตริย์ (Thai: Chat, Satsana, Phra Mahakasat, "Nation, Religion, King")
 Siam (1873-1910) : สพฺเพสํ สงฺฆภูตานํ สามคฺคี วุฑฺฒิ สาธิกา (Pāli: शब्बेसम् सम्घभुतनम् समग्घि भुद्धि सधिक, Sabbesaṃ saṃghabhūtānaṃ samagghī vuḍḍhi sadhikā,"Unity amongst those uniting brings about success and prosperity.")

See also
 List of educational institutions with Sanskrit mottos
 List of Sanskrit universities in India
 List of Sanskrit academic institutes outside India
 List of military unit mottoes by country
 List of Sanskrit loanwords in English
 List of Sanskrit loanwords in Hindi
 List of Sanskrit loanwords in Indonesian
 List of Sanskrit loanwords in Tagalog
 List of Sanskrit inscriptions in the Malay world
 List of historic Sanskrit texts 
 List of Sanskrit Buddhist literature
 List of legendary creatures in Sanskrit Hindu mythology 
 List of Sanskrit poets
 List of languages by first written accounts
 Sanskrit Wikipedia

References

Sanskrit Phrases As Mottos
Indosphere